The Colchic gudgeon (Gobio caucasicus) is a species of gudgeon, a small freshwater in the family Cyprinidae. It is found in the Black Sea basin in Russia, Georgia, and Turkey.

References

 

Gobio
Fish described in 1901